Lintneria tricolor is a moth of the  family Sphingidae. It is known from Dominica.

The wingspan is 95–100 mm. Adults have been recorded in June.

The larvae probably feed on Lamiaceae (such as Salvia, Mentha, Monarda and Hyptis), Hydrophylloideae (such as Wigandia) and Verbenaceae species (such as Verbena and Lantana).

References

Lintneria
Moths described in 1923